The following lists events that happened during 2023 in South America.

Incumbents

Argentina 

 President: Alberto Fernández (since 2019)
 Vice President: Cristina Fernández de Kirchner (since 2019)

Argentina claims sovereignty over part of Antarctica, the Islas Malvinas, and South Georgia and the South Sandwich Islands.

Bolivia 

 President: Luis Arce
 Vice President: David Choquehuanca

Brazil 

 President: Luiz Inácio Lula da Silva (2023 – present)
 Vice President: Geraldo Alckmin (2023 – present)

Chile 

 President: Gabriel Boric (since 2022)
 President of the Senate: Álvaro Elizalde (since 2022)
 President of the Chamber of Deputies: Raúl Soto (since 2022)

Chile includes the Juan Fernández Islands and Easter Island in the Pacific Ocean. It also claims Chilean Antarctic Territory.

Easter Island 
Alcalde: Pedro Edmunds Paoa

Juan Fernández Islands 
Alcalde: Felipe Paredes Vergara

Colombia 

 President: Gustavo Petro
 Vice President: Francia Márquez

Ecuador 

 President: Guillermo Lasso (since 2021)
 Vice President: Alfredo Borrero (since 2021)

Guyana 

 President: Irfaan Ali (since 2020)
 Prime Minister: Mark Phillips (since 2020)

Guayana Esequiba is administered by Guyana but claimed by Venezuela. Tigri Area is disputed with Suriname.

Paraguay 

 President: Mario Abdo Benítez
 Vice President: Hugo Velázquez Moreno

Peru 

 President: Dina Boluarte 
 Prime Minister: Alberto Otárola (from 21 December)

Suriname 

 President: Chan Santokhi (since 2020)
 Vice President: Ronnie Brunswijk (since 2020)

Tigri Area is disputed with Guyana.

Uruguay 

 President: Luis Lacalle Pou 
 Vice President: Beatriz Argimón

Venezuela 

 President: Nicolás Maduro
 Vice President: Delcy Rodríguez

Venezuela claims Guayana Esequiba as part of its territory.

British Overseas Territories 

 Monarch: Charles III

Falkland Islands 

 Governor: Alison Blake (since 2022)
 Chief Executive: Andy Keeling (since 2021)

The Falkland Islands are also claimed by Argentina, which calls them Islas Malvinas (Malvinas Islands).

Saint Helena, Ascension and Tristan da Cunha 

 Governor of Saint Helena: Nigel Phillips
 Administrator of Ascension: Simon Minshull
 Administrators of Tristan da Cunha: Sean Burns

South Georgia and the South Sandwich Islands 

 Commissioner: Alison Blake (since 2022)

French Guiana 

 President: Emmanuel Macron (since 2017)
 Prime Minister: Élisabeth Borne (since 2022)
 Prefect: Thierry Queffelec

Events 

5 February — 2023 Ecuadorian constitutional referendum
 23 April – 2023 Paraguayan general election
 14 October – An annular solar eclipse will be visible in the Western U.S., Mexico, Central America, Colombia, and Brazil and will be the 44th solar eclipse of Solar Saros 134.
 29 October – 2023 Argentine general election

See also 

2020s
2020s in political history
Mercosur
Organization of American States
Organization of Ibero-American States
Caribbean Community
Union of South American Nations

References 

 
2020s in South America
Years of the 21st century in South America